Richard Spicer or Newport (died c. 1435), of Plymouth, Devon and Portsmouth, Hampshire was an English politician.

Family
His sons, Richard and John, were also MPs.

Career
He was a Member (MP) of the Parliament of England for Portsmouth in 1402.

References

14th-century births
1435 deaths
English MPs 1435
Politicians from Plymouth, Devon
Members of the Parliament of England (pre-1707) for Portsmouth
English MPs 1402